Loop is the fifth album by the rock artist Keller Williams. It was released in 2001 on SCI Fidelity Records. The album contains live recordings of three performances in the Pacific Northwest in 2000.

Track listing
 Thin Mint  4:15  
 Kiwi and the Apricot 4:07  
 More Than a Little 7:48  
 Vacate 6:21  
 Blatant Ripoff 4:22  
 Kidney in a Cooler 5:59  
 Landlord 7:03  
 Turn in Difference 6:00  
 No Hablo Espanol 2:26  
 Rockumal 3:13  
 Stupid Questions 7:52  
 Inhale to the Chief 4:28  
 Nomini 3:44

Credits
Tom Capek - Mastering  
Phil Crumrine - Multi-Track Mix  
Doug Derryberry - Mixing  
Keller Williams - Producer

References

2001 live albums
Keller Williams albums